Physematia concordalis is a moth in the family Crambidae. It was described by Julius Lederer in 1863. It is found in India's Nicobar Islands.

References

Spilomelinae
Moths described in 1863